Ewyas Harold Castle was a castle in the village of Ewyas Harold in Herefordshire, England.

History
The first castle on the site is believed to be one of the very few which were built under the Saxons before the Norman conquest. This structure was likely raised in 1048, possibly by Osbern Pentecost, on the site of an earlier fortification, likely a Saxon burg built during the 10th century. It was a motte and bailey castle overlooking the Dulas Brook. In 1052 the original castle was destroyed, either on the orders of Earl Godwin or by the Welsh in a raid.

Following the Norman conquest and invasion of the area the castle was rebuilt by William Fitz Osbern, Earl of Hereford. In 1086, the Domesday Book recorded:

In the castle he has two messuages.

In 1100 a priory was founded within the bailey of the castle.

The castle fell into partial decay until the early 15th century. It was then in the possession of William Beauchamp, Lord Abergavenny, who refortified it in the face of the threat from Owain Glyndŵr. There is no record of it being attacked at this time. Owain and his various forces focused their attention on strategies and opportunities elsewhere.

The castle again fell into ruin by 1645, and today only earthworks remain on the edge of the village to mark where it once stood.

Notes

References

Sources
 Bannister, Arthur Thomas, The history of Ewias Harold, its castle, priory, and church (Hereford 1902)

External links
The official record of the castle 
 Ewyas Harold Castle - archaeology

Buildings and structures completed in 1048
Castles in Herefordshire
Castle, Ewyas
Castles in England built before 1066